Subhash Bhaskar Velingkar was a member of the Rashtriya Swayamsevak Sangh (RSS), a Hindu nationalist organization in India, belonging to the Gomantak Maratha Samaj community. Goa Prant of the Rashtriya Swayamsevak Sangh was formed under the leadership of Velingkar.

He launched Bharatiya Bhasha Suraksha Manch an organization which promotes Konkani and Marathi in schools and the withdrawal of grants to English medium schools in the state of the Goa. Velingkar oppose the decision of the Digambar Kamat-led government to provide grants to primary level English schools which was opposed by Manohar Parrikar and other opposition leaders. After Bharatiya Janata Party-Maharashtrawadi Gomantak Party alliance emerged victorious in the 2012 Goa Legislative Assembly election, they continued the grants which Velingkar opposed and subsequently dropped from the Rashtriya Swayamsevak Sangh as the Goa chief due to his decision to float a political party. In  protest 400 volunteers of the Rashtriya Swayamsevak Sangh resigned.

On October 2, 2016, Velingkar officially Goa Suraksha Manch but Velingkar neither held any post and did not contest 2017 Goa Legislative Assembly election. He contested Panaji, Goa in the by-election in 2019 as a member of the Goa Suraksha Manch and 516 votes only.

Subash Velingkar Culture War of “Goencho Saib” Controversy 
The controversy was initiated by the Hindu Raksha Maha Aghadi chief Subash Velingkar.  Subhash Velingkar stated that Saint Francis Xavier was instrumental in bringing in the Goa Inquisition during colonial rule. “Goencho Saib” can be translated into English from Konkani as, “Goencho” from Goa or Goan Origin whereas “Saib” means “partron”, thus means Goan Patron for catholic goans.  Velingkar continued that, instead of Saint Francis Xavier being known as Goencho Saib,  the Hindu sage Parushuram should be known as Goencho Saib. 

The reaction to this synthetic narrative was swift.  Viresh Borkar, newly elected politician from Revolutionary Goan Party, accused the BJP of being involved with Velingkar in creating the controversy.   Current Goa Chief Minister from the controversy over Saint Francis Xavier, and added, his government is focused on keeping harmony and equality, which is characteristic to Goa.

References

1949 births
Living people
People from Panaji
Rashtriya Swayamsevak Sangh pracharaks
Goa Suraksha Manch politicians